Hadesina is a genus of moths of the family Notodontidae. It consists of the following species:
Hadesina caerulescens  (Schaus, 1913) 
Hadesina divisa Dognin, 1902
Hadesina goeleti Miller, 2008
Hadesina limbaria Warren, 1900

Notodontidae of South America